An Audience with John Farnham is a DVD release by Australian singer John Farnham. The DVD was released in Australia on 9 December 2002.

Originally this program aired on Australia's Channel Seven Network on 23 October 2002, and was filmed at Channel Seven Studios in Melbourne, Australia.

DVD track listing
 "Introduction"  – 0:29
 "Chain Reaction" (D. Stewart, S. Stewart) – 3:16
 "Q&A: Part 1"  – 7:13
 "No Ordinary World" (L. Andersson, S. Davis) – 3:57
 "Q&A: Part 2"  – 1:53
 "Pressure Down" (H. Bogdanovs) – 4:05
 "Q&A: Part 3"  – 15:05
 "Keep Talking" (P. Thornalley, D. Munday) – 3:27
 "Q&A: Part 4"  – 4:32
 "That's Freedom" (T. Kimmel, J. Chapman) – 4:41
 "Q&A: Part 5"  – 1:48
 "When I Can't Have You" (S. Waermo, W. Sela) – 4:48
 "Q&A: Part 6"  – 5:09
 "The Last Time" (M. Jagger, K. Richards) – 5:37
 "Behind The Scenes [Bonus Track]"  – 3:42
 "Bonus Q&A [Bonus Track]"  – 3:22

Charts

Certifications

References

2002 video albums
John Farnham video albums
John Farnham live albums
Live video albums
2002 live albums